Leon Ames (born Harry L. Wycoff; January 20, 1902 – October 12, 1993) was an American film and television actor. He is best remembered for playing father figures in such films as Meet Me in St. Louis (1944; with Lucille Bremer, Margaret O'Brien and Judy Garland as his daughters), Little Women (1949), On Moonlight Bay (1951), and By the Light of the Silvery Moon (1953). The fathers whom Ames portrayed were often somewhat stuffy and exasperated by the younger generation, but ultimately kind and understanding. Probably his best-known purely dramatic role was as DA Kyle Sackett in the crime film The Postman Always Rings Twice (1946).

Early years
Leon Ames was born on January 20, 1902, in Portland, Indiana, son of Charles Elmer Wycoff and his wife, Cora Alice DeMoss. Some sources list his original last name as "Wykoff" or "Waycoff", and in his early films, he acted under the name Leon Waycoff. In 1935, Ames explained that he changed his name because Waycoff was often misspelled and mispronounced. Ames was his mother's maiden name. In the 1910 census, when his family was residing in Fowler, Indiana, Ames' name is given as Harry L. Wycoff. His father Charles was employed as managing a meat market.

Stage
Ames' involvement with entertainment began when he worked as stage manager for the Charles K. Champlin Theatre Company. He ventured into acting with the group and progressed to having the lead in a production of Tomorrow and Tomorrow in Los Angeles. He acted for three years with the Stuart Walker Stock Company in Cincinnati, Ohio.

He debuted on Broadway in It Pays to Sin (1933). His other Broadway credits include Howie (1958), Winesburg, Ohio, (1958), Slightly Married (1943), The Russian People (1942), Little Darling (1942), Guest in the House (1942), The Land Is Bright (1941), The Male Animal (1940), Thirsty Soil (1937), A House in the Country (1937), and Bright Honor (1936).

Film 
Ames made his film debut in Quick Millions in 1931. Later, during the 1940s, he was under contract to Metro-Goldwyn-Mayer. Among his important roles at MGM is his 1944 portrayal of Mr. Smith in the studio's massive hit and subsequent classic Meet Me in St. Louis.

Ames also appears in a featured role in The Postman Always Rings Twice (1946), portraying the district attorney Kyle Sackett. He appears too in the Doris Day-Gordon MacRae film On Moonlight Bay (1951), in its sequel By the Light of the Silvery Moon (1953), and in Peyton Place (1957). He performs the role of Samuel Eaton, Alfred Eaton's (Paul Newman) father, in From the Terrace (1960). In the 1961 Walt Disney comedy The Absent-Minded Professor, he is the college president Rufus Daggett and can be seen once again in that role in the film's 1963 sequel Son of Flubber. In 1970, he was cast as Secretary of the Navy Frank Knox in the action war film Tora! Tora! Tora! His last screen role is in Peggy Sue Got Married (1986), in which he plays the grandfather of Kathleen Turner's character.

Radio and television 
Ames' first radio broadcast was in January 1942 on Grand Central Station.

His television roles included leads in the adaptations of Life with Father (1953–55) and Father of the Bride (1961–62). His presence in the latter program was such that, after the show had been on the air a few months, Ames' role was increased because "'father, as played by veteran character actor Leon Ames, became the dominant figure in the whole show."

Ames had the title role of judge John Cooper in the syndicated series Frontier Judge and played Howard McMann in Bewitched.

He joined the cast of Mister Ed (1963–66) as Wilbur Post's neighbor, retired Colonel Gordon Kirkwood, after the death of actor Larry Keating, who had played Post's original neighbor Roger Addison. Ames also appeared in episodes of the NBC anthology series The Barbara Stanwyck Show, and on the short-lived CBS legal drama Storefront Lawyers.

He played the part of Grandpa Willis in The Jeffersons, episode “Jenny’s Grandparents” (Season 2, episode 10: 1975).

Other professional activities 
Ames was one of the founders of the Screen Actors Guild in 1933. He served as its president in 1957.  During the 1960s, Ames owned several Ford dealerships in California.

Personal life
Ames was the father of Robert Fletcher, who was left with his mother when she and Ames split up in 1923.

Ames wed actress Christine Gossett in 1938. The couple had a daughter, Shelley (b. 1940), and a son, Leon (b. 1943). Christine retired early from acting to raise their family. They remained married until Ames' death in 1993.

Ames supported Barry Goldwater in the 1964 United States presidential election.

Kidnapping
On February 12, 1964, Ames and his wife were held hostage in their home as an intruder demanded $50,000 before he would free them. Ames called his business partner, who obtained the money from a bank and delivered it to the house as instructed. After inspecting the cash, the kidnapper left Ames in the house, bound with tape, and instructed Mrs. Ames to drive him in the couple's car. He also forced both the business partner and a guest in the Ames house into the trunk. Eventually, police (who had been alerted by the partner while he was picking up the money) surrounded the car and freed the hostages.

Death 
On October 12, 1993, Ames died in Laguna Beach, California, of complications after suffering a stroke. He was 91. His gravesite is at Forest Lawn, Hollywood Hills Cemetery in Los Angeles.

Recognition 
In 1980, after 50 years in show business, Leon Ames received the Screen Actors Guild Life Achievement Award.

Complete filmography

Quick Millions (1931) as Hood (as Leon Waycoff)
Cannonball Express (1932) as Jack Logan (as Leon Waycoff)
Murders in the Rue Morgue (1932) as Pierre Dupin (as Leon Waycoff)
Stowaway (1932) as Tommy (as Leon Waycoff)
State's Attorney (1932) as First Trial Prosecutor (uncredited)
The Famous Ferguson Case (1932) as Judd Brooks (as Leon Waycoff)
Thirteen Women (1932) (scenes cut)
A Successful Calamity (1932) as Barney Davis - Witon's Junior Associate (as Leon Waycoff)
That's My Boy (1932) as Al Williams (as Leon Waycoff)
Uptown New York (1932) as Max Silver (as Leon Waycoff)
Silver Dollar (1932) as Yates' Secretary (uncredited)
Parachute Jumper (1933) as Pilot with Alabama (uncredited)
Forgotten (1933) as Louie Strauss (as Leon Waycoff)
Alimony Madness (1933) as John Thurman (as Leon Waycoff)
The Man Who Dared (1933) as (as Leon Waycoff)
Ship of Wanted Men (1933) as Capt. John Holden (as Leon Waycoff)
Only Yesterday (1933) as Lee (uncredited)
The Crosby Case (1934) as Clifford Mulford (uncredited)
I'll Tell the World (1934) as Spud Marshall (as Leon Waycoff)
Now I'll Tell (1934) as Max (as Leon Waycoff)
The Count of Monte Cristo (1934) as Beauchamp (uncredited)
Mutiny Ahead (1935) as McMurtrie
Rescue Squad (1935) as Lester Vaughn (as Leon Waycoff)
Reckless (1935) as Ralph Watson (as Leon Waycoff)
Strangers All (1935) as Frank Walker
Get That Man (1935) as Don Clayton / McDonald (as Leon Waycoff)
Death in the Air (1936) as Carl Goering
Song of Revolt (1937, Short) as Claude Joseph Rouget de Lisle
Soak the Poor (1937, Short) as Special Investigator Stanton
Charlie Chan on Broadway (1937) as Buzz Moran
Dangerously Yours (1937) as Phil
Murder in Greenwich Village (1937) as Rodney Hunter
45 Fathers (1937) as Vincent
The Spy Ring (1938) as Frank Denton
International Settlement (1938) as Monte Silvers
Walking Down Broadway (1938) as Frank Gatty
Bluebeard's Eighth Wife (1938) as Ex-Chauffeur (uncredited)
Island in the Sky (1938) as Marty Butler
Come On, Leathernecks! (1938) as Otto Wagner / Baroni
Mysterious Mr. Moto (1938) as Paul Brissac
Suez (1938) as Napoleon III - Emperor of France
Cipher Bureau (1938) as Maj. Philip Waring
Strange Faces (1938) as Joe Gurney
Secrets of a Nurse (1938) as Joe Largo
Mr. Sheldon Goes to Town (1939 short) as Salesman
Risky Business (1939) as Hinge Jackson
Blackwell's Island (1939) as County Prosecutor Ballinger (uncredited)
I Was a Convict (1939) as Jackson
Panama Patrol (1939) as Maj. Phillip Waring
Mr. Moto in Danger Island (1939) as Commissioner Madero
Code of the Streets (1939) as "Chick" Foster
Man of Conquest (1939) as John Hoskins
Help Wanted (1939, Short) as J. T. Evans - Labor Commissioner (uncredited)
Fugitive at Large (1939) as Carter
Thunder Afloat (1939) as Recruiting Officer (uncredited)
Calling All Marines (1939) as Murdock
Pack Up Your Troubles (1939) as Adjutant
The Marshal of Mesa City (1939) as Sheriff Jud Cronin
Legion of Lost Flyers (1939) as Smythe
East Side Kids (1940) as Pat O'Day
No Greater Sin (1941) as Dr. Edward Cavanaugh
Ellery Queen and the Murder Ring (1941) as John Stack
Crime Doctor (1943) as William Wheeler
The Iron Major (1943) as Robert 'Bob' Stewart
Thirty Seconds Over Tokyo (1944) as Lieut. Jurika
The Thin Man Goes Home (1945) as Edgar Draque
Meet Me in St. Louis (1944) as Mr. Alonzo Smith
Between Two Women (1945) as Mr. Masters (uncredited)
Fall Guy (1945 short) as Floyd Parkson
Son of Lassie (1945) as Anton
Anchors Aweigh (1945) as Admiral's Aide
Week-End at the Waldorf (1945) as Henry Burton
Yolanda and the Thief (1945) as Mr. Candle
They Were Expendable (1945) as Major James Morton
The Postman Always Rings Twice (1946) as Kyle Sackett
No Leave, No Love (1946) as Colonel Elliott
The Cockeyed Miracle (1946) as Ralph Humphrey
The Show-Off (1946) as Frank Harlin
The Great Morgan (1946) as K.F. Studio Exec
Lady in the Lake (1947) as Derace Kingsby
Undercover Maisie (1947) as Amor aka Willis Farnes
Song of the Thin Man (1947) as Mitchell Talbin
The Amazing Mr. Nordill (1947, Short) as Everett Nordill, aka Everton
Merton of the Movies (1947) as Lawrence Rupert
Alias a Gentleman (1948) as Matt Enley
On an Island with You (1948) as Commander Harrison
The Velvet Touch (1948) as Gordon Dunning
A Date with Judy (1948) as Lucien T. Pringle
Little Women (1949) as Mr. March
Any Number Can Play (1949) as Dr. Palmer
Scene of the Crime (1949) as Capt. A.C. Forster
Battleground (1949) as The Chaplain
Ambush (1950) as Maj. C.E. Breverly
The Big Hangover (1950) as Carl Bellcap
The Skipper Surprised His Wife (1950) as Dr. Philip Abbott
Crisis (1950) as Sam Proctor
The Happy Years (1950) as Samuel H. Stover - Sr.
Dial 1119 (1950) as Earl
Watch the Birdie (1950) as Grantland D. Farns
On Moonlight Bay (1951) as George Winfield
Cattle Drive (1951) as Chester Graham Sr.
It's a Big Country (1951) as Secret Service Man
Angel Face (1952) as Fred Barrett
By the Light of the Silvery Moon (1953) as George Winfield
Let's Do It Again (1953) as Chet Stuart
Sabre Jet (1953) as Lt. Col. George Eckert
Engagement Party (1956 short) as Elliott Winston
Peyton Place (1957) as Mr. Harrington
From the Terrace (1960) as Samuel Eaton
Maggie (1960, TV Movie) as Mark Bradley
The Absent-Minded Professor (1961) as President Rufus Daggett
Son of Flubber (1963) as President Rufus Daggett
The Misadventures of Merlin Jones (1964) as Judge Holmsby / Lex Fortas
The Monkey's Uncle (1965) as Judge Holmsby
On a Clear Day You Can See Forever (1970) as Burt Clews
Tora! Tora! Tora! (1970) as Frank Knox
Toklat (1971) as Old Man / Narrator
Hammersmith Is Out (1972) as General Sam Pembroke
Brother of the Wind (1973) as Narrator (voice)
The Meal (1975) as Bernard Wallace Kroger 
Timber Tramps (1975) as Deacon
Sherlock Holmes in New York (1976, TV Movie) as Daniel Furman
Claws (1977) as Ben Jones, Forest Commissioner
The Best Place to Be (1979, TV Movie) as William Callahan
Just You and Me, Kid (1979) as Manduke the Magnificent
Testament (1983) as Henry Abhart
Jake Speed (1986) as Pop Winston
Peggy Sue Got Married (1986) as Barney Alvorg (final film role)

Partial television credits
Life with Father (1953–1955) as Clarence Day, Sr.
Westinghouse Studio One (1958), episode "Tongue of Angels" as Cyrus Walker
General Electric Theater (1960), episode "Adam's Apples" as Malcolm Fownes
Father of the Bride (1961–1962) as Stanley Banks
Mister Ed (1963–1965) as Gordon Kirkwood
The Andy Griffith Show (season 7, episode 9 - 1966) as Mr. Hampton
My Three Sons (Season 9 episode 2 – 1968) as Dr. Osborne
Bewitched (Season 6 episode 21 - 1970) "What Makes Darrin Run?" as Howard McMann
The Ghost and Mrs. Muir (Season 2 episode 24 - 1970), episode "Wedding Day?????" as Bradford Williams
The Jeffersons (Season 2, episode 10 – 1975) as Grandpa Willis in the episode “Jenny’s Grandparents.”
The Littlest Hobo (Season 1 episode 8 - 1979), episode "Heritage" as Jasper McGillicutty

See also
List of kidnappings

References

External links

 

1902 births
1993 deaths
20th-century American male actors
Activists from California
American male film actors
American male stage actors
American male television actors
American people taken hostage
Burials at Forest Lawn Memorial Park (Hollywood Hills)
California Republicans
Formerly missing people
Indiana Republicans
Metro-Goldwyn-Mayer contract players
Male actors from Indiana
People from Portland, Indiana
Presidents of the Screen Actors Guild
Screen Actors Guild Life Achievement Award